Operation Warrior's Rage was a United States and Iraqi Army cordon-and-search operation during the US occupation of Iraq. The operation was performed on the evening of 15 July 2005.

The operation
On the evening of 15 July 2005, elements of the 256th Brigade Combat Team and 6th Iraqi Army Division successfully detained targets in their areas of operation through cordon-and-search operations and combat patrols. Soldiers of the 3rd Battalion, 156th Infantry Regiment, 256th Brigade Combat Team, and the 4th Battalion, 1st Iraqi Army, searched houses suspected of holding insurgents in the Ameriyah district of Baghdad. The mission resulted in the capture of three suspects, two of whom were Syrian. The search found 10 to 12 122/130-millimeter rounds enhanced with propane to make a larger fireball in the explosion.

In another area of operation, soldiers of the 2nd Battalion, 156th Infantry Regiment, captured three personnel, all positively identified as brigade-level targets. The 2-156th personnel knocked on doors when the targeted houses turned up empty, and residents of the neighborhood led soldiers to the suspected insurgents when they initially were not in their homes.

The combined efforts of other 256th and Iraqi Army units resulted in the capture of 33 suspected insurgents. Soldiers of 1st Battalion, 69th Infantry Regiment, and 3rd Battalion, 4th Iraqi Army brought in 15 suspected insurgents after conducting their cordon-and-search missions. While conducting patrols in their area, the 1st Squadron, 11th Armored Cavalry Regiment, and 2nd Battalion, 3rd Iraqi Army, performed a hasty cordon-and-search and brought in 18 suspected insurgents, who were then held for questioning at an undisclosed location.

Military units involved
US forces reported to be involved were
2nd Battalion, 156th Infantry Regiment
3rd Battalion, 156th Infantry Regiment, 256th Brigade Combat Team
1st Squadron, 11th Armored Cavalry Regiment

Iraqi Units involved
4th Battalion, 1st Iraqi Army
2nd Battalion, 3rd Iraqi Army

Casualties
No deaths or casualties were reported during the operation.

References

 National Force – Iraq

Military operations of the Iraq War in 2005
Iraqi insurgency (2003–2011)